Frognall is a large boom-era mansion located at 54 Mont Albert Road in the Melbourne suburb of Canterbury.

History
Frognall was designed by the architect James Gall in 1888 in the Italianate style that was popular during the boom period of 1880s Melbourne. It was built between the years of 1889-91 for the prominent timber merchant Clarence Hicks, although he did not stay long as he was forced to sell during the financial collapse of 1893.

In 1901 the building was purchased by the Laycock family who stayed there until 1942 when they offered the building to the Commonwealth Government to help with the war effort. The house became part of the RAAF communications network during the war and was occupied by the RAAF for more than 40 years afterwards.

Architecture 
Frognall is an example of the Italianate style mansion which is commonly associated with the boom period of Melbourne architecture in the 1880s, although it is unusual in the extent of its ornamentation. It has a particularly rich level of cement render detailing, including arcaded and balustraded loggia. The grandeur of the building is enhanced by its pedimented entrance and deep bracketed eaves. The tower is capped at each side by projecting broken pediments.

Frognall is typical of the wave of large mansions which were built in Melbourne's eastern suburbs during the 1880s (other examples include Raheen, Kew and Stonington mansion. However it is a rare example that has retained almost its entire original sub-division lot of 1859 and the core of the decorative garden that was created when the building was completed. It is also one of the rare boom period mansions which have retained their service wing, and stable and coach house block in original condition.

References

Heritage-listed buildings in Melbourne
Houses in Melbourne
Gardens in Victoria (Australia)
Victorian architecture in Victoria (Australia)
Buildings and structures in the City of Boroondara
Houses completed in 1891
1891 establishments in Australia